This is a list of top goalscorers in the men's Olympic water polo tournament since the inaugural official edition in 1900.

Abbreviations

Overall top goalscorers
As of 2016, 57 male players have scored 30 or more goals at the Summer Olympics.

By confederation
Last updated: 1 April 2021.

By team
Last updated: 1 April 2021.

Legend
 Team† – Defunct team

Notes:

 Dmitry Apanasenko (40 goals) is counted as a Russian player.
 Armando Fernández (37 goals) is counted as a West German player.
 Pietro Figlioli (47 goals) is counted as an Italian player.
 Frank Otto (38 goals) is counted as a German player.
 Iván Pérez (31 goals) is counted as a Spanish player.
 Felipe Perrone (42 goals) is counted as a Spanish player.
 Aleksandar Šapić (64 goals) is counted as a Serbian player.
 Dubravko Šimenc (30 goals) is counted as a Croatian player.
 Hagen Stamm (45 goals) is counted as a German player.
 Vladimir Vujasinović (34 goals) is counted as a Serbian player.

Most goals scored

One match

One tournament

The following table is pre-sorted by edition of the Olympics (in ascending order), name of the team (in ascending order), number of goals (in descending order), name of the player (in ascending order), respectively. Last updated: 1 April 2021.

Legend
 Team* – Host team

Sources:
 Official Reports (PDF): 1900–1972, 1976 (p. 497), 1980 (p. 510), 1984 (p. 534), 1988–1996;
 Official Results Books (PDF): 2000 (pp. 45–92), 2004 (p. 184), 2008 (p. 179), 2012 (p. 466), 2016 (p. 100);
 Olympedia: 1900–2016 (men's tournaments);
 Sports Reference: 1900–2016 (men's tournaments).

Top goalscorers in each tournament

All-time

The following table is pre-sorted by edition of the Olympics (in ascending order), name of the team (in ascending order), number of total goals (in descending order), name of the player (in ascending order), respectively. Last updated: 1 April 2021.

Legend
 Team* – Host team

Sources:
 Official Reports (PDF): 1900–1972, 1976 (p. 497), 1980 (p. 510), 1984 (p. 534), 1988–1996;
 Official Results Books (PDF): 2000 (pp. 45–92), 2004 (p. 184), 2008 (p. 179), 2012 (p. 466), 2016 (p. 100);
 Olympedia: 1900–2016 (men's tournaments);
 Sports Reference: 1900–2016 (men's tournaments).

Top goalscorers by team
The following tables are pre-sorted by number of total goals (in descending order), year of the last Olympic appearance (in ascending order), year of the first Olympic appearance (in ascending order), name of the player (in ascending order), respectively.

Legend
 Year* – As host team
 Team† – Defunct team

Argentina
 Men's national team: 
 Team appearances: 4 (1928, 1948–1952, 1960)
 As host team: —
 Number of goalscorers (50+ goals): 0
 Number of goalscorers (40–49 goals): 0
 Number of goalscorers (30–39 goals): 0
 Last updated: 1 April 2021.

Australia
 Men's national team: 
 Team appearances: 17 (1948–1964, 1972–1992, 2000*–2020)
 As host team: 1956*, 2000*
* Number of goalscorers (50+ goals): 1
 Number of goalscorers (40–49 goals): 0
 Number of goalscorers (30–39 goals): 3
 Last updated: 1 April 2021.

Legend
  – Hosts

Sources:
 Official Reports (PDF): 1948–1964, 1972–1992;
 Official Results Books (PDF): 2000 (pp. 48, 52, 56, 65–66, 71, 73, 76), 2004 (pp. 187–188), 2008 (pp. 181–182), 2012 (pp. 468–469), 2016 (pp. 103–104).
Note:
 Pietro Figlioli is listed in section Italy.

Austria
 Men's national team: 
 Team appearances: 3 (1912, 1936, 1952)
 As host team: —
 Number of goalscorers (50+ goals): 0
 Number of goalscorers (40–49 goals): 0
 Number of goalscorers (30–39 goals): 0
 Last updated: 1 April 2021.

Belgium
 Men's national team: 
 Team appearances: 11 (1900, 1908–1928, 1936–1952, 1960–1964)
 As host team: 1920*
* Number of goalscorers (50+ goals): 0
 Number of goalscorers (40–49 goals): 0
 Number of goalscorers (30–39 goals): 0
 Last updated: 1 April 2021.

Brazil
 Men's national team: 
 Team appearances: 8 (1920, 1932, 1952, 1960–1968, 1984, 2016*)
 As host team: 2016*
* Number of goalscorers (50+ goals): 0
 Number of goalscorers (40–49 goals): 0
 Number of goalscorers (30–39 goals): 0
 Last updated: 1 April 2021.

Note:
 Felipe Perrone is listed in section Spain.

Bulgaria
 Men's national team: 
 Team appearances: 2 (1972, 1980)
 As host team: —
 Number of goalscorers (50+ goals): 0
 Number of goalscorers (40–49 goals): 0
 Number of goalscorers (30–39 goals): 0
 Last updated: 1 April 2021.

Canada
 Men's national team: 
 Team appearances: 4 (1972–1976*, 1984, 2008)
 As host team: 1976*
* Number of goalscorers (50+ goals): 0
 Number of goalscorers (40–49 goals): 0
 Number of goalscorers (30–39 goals): 0
 Last updated: 1 April 2021.

Chile
 Men's national team: 
 Team appearances: 1 (1948)
 As host team: —
 Number of goalscorers (50+ goals): 0
 Number of goalscorers (40–49 goals): 0
 Number of goalscorers (30–39 goals): 0
 Last updated: 1 April 2021.

China
 Men's national team: 
 Team appearances: 3 (1984–1988, 2008*)
 As host team: 2008*
 Number of goalscorers (50+ goals): 0
 Number of goalscorers (40–49 goals): 0
 Number of goalscorers (30–39 goals): 0
 Last updated: 1 April 2021.

Croatia
 Men's national team: 
 Team appearances: 7 (1996–2020)
 As host team: —
 Related team: Yugoslavia†
* Number of goalscorers (50+ goals): 0
 Number of goalscorers (40–49 goals): 0
 Number of goalscorers (30–39 goals): 2
 Last updated: 1 April 2021.

Abbreviation
 CRO – Croatia
 YUG – Yugoslavia

Sources:
 Official Reports (PDF): 1988, 1996;
 Official Results Books (PDF): 2000 (pp. 48, 51, 54, 79, 82, 86–87, 92), 2004 (pp. 191–192), 2008 (pp. 190–191), 2012 (pp. 471–472), 2016 (pp. 109–110).

Cuba
 Men's national team: 
 Team appearances: 5 (1968–1980, 1992)
 As host team: —
 Number of goalscorers (50+ goals): 0
 Number of goalscorers (40–49 goals): 0
 Number of goalscorers (30–39 goals): 0
 Last updated: 1 April 2021.

Note:
 Iván Pérez is listed in section Spain.

Czechoslovakia
 Men's national team: †
 Team appearances: 5 (1920–1928, 1936, 1992)
 As host team: —
 Related team: Slovakia
 Number of goalscorers (50+ goals): 0
 Number of goalscorers (40–49 goals): 0
 Number of goalscorers (30–39 goals): 0
 Last updated: 1 April 2021.

East Germany
 Men's national team: †
 Team appearances: 1 (1968)
 As host team: —
 Related teams: Germany, United Team of Germany†
 Number of goalscorers (50+ goals): 0
 Number of goalscorers (40–49 goals): 0
 Number of goalscorers (30–39 goals): 0
 Last updated: 1 April 2021.

Egypt
 Men's national team: 
 Team appearances: 6 (1948–1952, 1960–1968, 2004)
 As host team: —
* Number of goalscorers (50+ goals): 0
 Number of goalscorers (40–49 goals): 0
 Number of goalscorers (30–39 goals): 0
 Last updated: 1 April 2021.

France
 Men's national team: 
 Team appearances: 11 (1900*, 1912–1928, 1936–1948, 1960, 1988–1992, 2016)
 As host team: 1900*, 1924*
* Number of goalscorers (50+ goals): 0
 Number of goalscorers (40–49 goals): 0
 Number of goalscorers (30–39 goals): 1
 Last updated: 1 April 2021.

Sources:
 Official Reports (PDF): 1900, 1912–1928, 1936–1948, 1960, 1988–1992;
 Official Results Books (PDF): 2016 (pp. 114–115).

Germany
 Men's national team: 
 Team appearances: 9 (1900, 1928–1936*, 1952, 1992–1996, 2004–2008)
 As host team: 1936*
 Related teams: United Team of Germany†, East Germany†, West Germany†
 Number of goalscorers (50+ goals): 0
 Number of goalscorers (40–49 goals): 1
 Number of goalscorers (30–39 goals): 1
 Last updated: 1 April 2021.

Abbreviation
 FRG – West Germany
 GER – Germany

Sources:
 Official Reports (PDF): 1900, 1928–1936, 1952, 1984–1996;
 Official Results Books (PDF): 2004 (pp. 199–200), 2008 (pp. 196–197).

Great Britain
 Men's national team: 
 Team appearances: 11 (1900, 1908*–1928, 1936–1956, 2012*)
 As host team: 1908*, 1948*, 2012*
* Number of goalscorers (50+ goals): 0
 Number of goalscorers (40–49 goals): 0
 Number of goalscorers (30–39 goals): 0
 Last updated: 1 April 2021.

Greece
 Men's national team: 
 Team appearances: 16 (1920–1924, 1948, 1968–1972, 1980–2020)
 As host team: 2004*
* Number of goalscorers (50+ goals): 0
 Number of goalscorers (40–49 goals): 2
 Number of goalscorers (30–39 goals): 2
 Last updated: 1 April 2021.

Legend
  – Hosts

Sources:
 Official Reports (PDF): 1920–1924, 1948, 1968–1972, 1980–1996;
 Official Results Books (PDF): 2000 (pp. 57, 59, 61, 80–81, 86, 88, 91), 2004 (pp. 203–204), 2008 (pp. 199–200), 2012 (pp. 478–479), 2016 (pp. 117–118).

Hungary
 Men's national team: 
 Team appearances: 23 (1912, 1924–1980, 1988–2020)
 As host team: —
* Number of goalscorers (50+ goals): 2
 Number of goalscorers (40–49 goals): 3
 Number of goalscorers (30–39 goals): 4
 Last updated: 1 April 2021.

Sources:
 Official Reports (PDF): 1912, 1924–1980, 1988–1996;
 Official Results Books (PDF): 2000 (pp. 45, 50, 55, 78, 81, 84, 87, 90), 2004 (pp. 207–208), 2008 (pp. 202–203), 2012 (pp. 481–482), 2016 (pp. 120–121).

Iceland
 Men's national team: 
 Team appearances: 1 (1936)
 As host team: —
 Number of goalscorers (50+ goals): 0
 Number of goalscorers (40–49 goals): 0
 Number of goalscorers (30–39 goals): 0
 Last updated: 1 April 2021.

India
 Men's national team: 
 Team appearances: 2 (1948–1952)
 As host team: —
 Number of goalscorers (50+ goals): 0
 Number of goalscorers (40–49 goals): 0
 Number of goalscorers (30–39 goals): 0
 Last updated: 1 April 2021.

Iran
 Men's national team: 
 Team appearances: 1 (1976)
 As host team: —
 Number of goalscorers (50+ goals): 0
 Number of goalscorers (40–49 goals): 0
 Number of goalscorers (30–39 goals): 0
 Last updated: 1 April 2021.

Republic of Ireland
 Men's national team: 
 Team appearances: 2 (1924–1928)
 As host team: —
 Number of goalscorers (50+ goals): 0
 Number of goalscorers (40–49 goals): 0
 Number of goalscorers (30–39 goals): 0
 Last updated: 1 April 2021.

Italy
 Men's national team: 
 Team appearances: 21 (1920–1924, 1948–2020)
 As host team: 1960*
* Number of goalscorers (50+ goals): 2
 Number of goalscorers (40–49 goals): 2
 Number of goalscorers (30–39 goals): 4
 Last updated: 1 April 2021.

Legend and abbreviation
  – Hosts
 AUS – Australia
 ITA – Italy

Sources:
 Official Reports (PDF): 1920–1924, 1948–1996;
 Official Results Books (PDF): 2000 (pp. 47, 52, 55, 64, 68–69, 74, 76), 2004 (pp. 211–212), 2008 (pp. 205–206), 2012 (pp. 484–485), 2016 (pp. 123–124).

Japan
 Men's national team: 
 Team appearances: 9 (1932–1936, 1960–1972, 1984, 2016–2020)
 As host team: 1964, 2020*
* Number of goalscorers (50+ goals): 0
 Number of goalscorers (40–49 goals): 0
 Number of goalscorers (30–39 goals): 0
 Last updated: 1 April 2021.

Kazakhstan
 Men's national team: 
 Team appearances: 4 (2000–2004, 2012, 2020)
 As host team: —
 Related teams: Soviet Union†, Unified Team†
* Number of goalscorers (50+ goals): 0
 Number of goalscorers (40–49 goals): 0
 Number of goalscorers (30–39 goals): 0
 Last updated: 1 April 2021.

Luxembourg
 Men's national team: 
 Team appearances: 1 (1928)
 As host team: —
 Number of goalscorers (50+ goals): 0
 Number of goalscorers (40–49 goals): 0
 Number of goalscorers (30–39 goals): 0
 Last updated: 1 April 2021.

Malta
 Men's national team: 
 Team appearances: 2 (1928, 1936)
 As host team: —
 Number of goalscorers (50+ goals): 0
 Number of goalscorers (40–49 goals): 0
 Number of goalscorers (30–39 goals): 0
 Last updated: 1 April 2021.

Mexico
 Men's national team: 
 Team appearances: 4 (1952, 1968*–1976)
 As host team: 1968*
 Number of goalscorers (50+ goals): 0
 Number of goalscorers (40–49 goals): 0
 Number of goalscorers (30–39 goals): 0
 Last updated: 1 April 2021.

Note:
 Armando Fernández is listed in section West Germany.

Montenegro
 Men's national team: 
 Team appearances: 4 (2008–2020)
 As host team: —
 Related teams: Yugoslavia†, FR Yugoslavia†, Serbia and Montenegro†
* Number of goalscorers (50+ goals): 0
 Number of goalscorers (40–49 goals): 0
 Number of goalscorers (30–39 goals): 2
 Last updated: 1 April 2021.

Source:
 Official Results Books (PDF): 2008 (pp. 208–209), 2012 (pp. 489–490), 2016 (pp. 128–129).

Netherlands
 Men's national team: 
 Team appearances: 17 (1908, 1920–1928*, 1936–1952, 1960–1984, 1992–2000)
 As host team: 1928*
* Number of goalscorers (50+ goals): 0
 Number of goalscorers (40–49 goals): 2
 Number of goalscorers (30–39 goals): 1
 Last updated: 1 April 2021.

Sources:
 Official Reports (PDF): 1908, 1920–1928, 1936–1952, 1960–1984, 1992–1996;
 Official Results Books (PDF): 2000 (pp. 58, 60–61, 79, 83–84, 89, 91).

Portugal
 Men's national team: 
 Team appearances: 1 (1952)
 As host team: —
 Number of goalscorers (50+ goals): 0
 Number of goalscorers (40–49 goals): 0
 Number of goalscorers (30–39 goals): 0
 Last updated: 1 April 2021.

Romania
 Men's national team: 
 Team appearances: 9 (1952–1964, 1972–1980, 1996, 2012)
 As host team: —
* Number of goalscorers (50+ goals): 0
 Number of goalscorers (40–49 goals): 0
 Number of goalscorers (30–39 goals): 0
 Last updated: 1 April 2021.

Russia
 Men's national team: 
 Team appearances: 3 (1996–2004)
 As host team: —
 Related teams: Soviet Union†, Unified Team†
* Number of goalscorers (50+ goals): 0
 Number of goalscorers (40–49 goals): 1
 Number of goalscorers (30–39 goals): 1
 Last updated: 1 April 2021.

Abbreviation
 EUN – Unified Team
 RUS – Russia
 URS – Soviet Union

Sources:
 Official Reports (PDF): 1996;
 Official Results Books (PDF): 2000 (pp. 45, 49, 53, 63, 66, 69, 72, 75), 2004 (pp. 219–220).

Serbia
 Men's national team: 
 Team appearances: 4 (2008–2020)
 As host team: —
 Related teams: Yugoslavia†, FR Yugoslavia†, Serbia and Montenegro†
* Number of goalscorers (50+ goals): 1
 Number of goalscorers (40–49 goals): 1
 Number of goalscorers (30–39 goals): 2
 Last updated: 1 April 2021.

Abbreviation
 FRY – FR Yugoslavia
 SCG – Serbia and Montenegro
 SRB – Serbia

Sources:
 Official Reports (PDF): 1996;
 Official Results Books (PDF): 2000 (pp. 46, 50, 56, 78, 83, 85, 88, 92), 2004 (pp. 223–224), 2008 (pp. 211–212), 2012 (pp. 494–495), 2016 (pp. 131–132).

Serbia and Montenegro
 Men's national team: †
 Team appearances: 1 (2004)
 As host team: —
 Related teams: Yugoslavia†, FR Yugoslavia†, Montenegro, Serbia
 Number of goalscorers (50+ goals): 0
 Number of goalscorers (40–49 goals): 0
 Number of goalscorers (30–39 goals): 0
 Last updated: 1 April 2021.

Notes:
 Aleksandar Šapić is listed in section Serbia.
 Vladimir Vujasinović is listed in section Serbia.

Singapore
 Men's national team: 
 Team appearances: 1 (1956)
 As host team: —
 Number of goalscorers (50+ goals): 0
 Number of goalscorers (40–49 goals): 0
 Number of goalscorers (30–39 goals): 0
 Last updated: 1 April 2021.

Slovakia
 Men's national team: 
 Team appearances: 1 (2000)
 As host team: —
 Related team: Czechoslovakia†
 Number of goalscorers (50+ goals): 0
 Number of goalscorers (40–49 goals): 0
 Number of goalscorers (30–39 goals): 0
 Last updated: 1 April 2021.

South Africa
 Men's national team: 
 Team appearances: 3 (1952, 1960, 2020)
 As host team: —
 Number of goalscorers (50+ goals): 0
 Number of goalscorers (40–49 goals): 0
 Number of goalscorers (30–39 goals): 0
 Last updated: 1 April 2021.

South Korea
 Men's national team: 
 Team appearances: 1 (1988*)
 As host team: 1988*
 Number of goalscorers (50+ goals): 0
 Number of goalscorers (40–49 goals): 0
 Number of goalscorers (30–39 goals): 0
 Last updated: 1 April 2021.

Soviet Union
 Men's national team: †
 Team appearances: 9 (1952–1980*, 1988)
 As host team: 1980*
 Related teams: Unified Team†, Kazakhstan, Russia, Ukraine
* Number of goalscorers (50+ goals): 0
 Number of goalscorers (40–49 goals): 0
 Number of goalscorers (30–39 goals): 1
 Last updated: 1 April 2021.

Legend
  – Hosts

Source:
 Official Reports (PDF): 1952–1980, 1988.
Note:
 Dmitry Apanasenko is listed in section Russia.

Spain
 Men's national team: 
 Team appearances: 18 (1920–1928, 1948–1952, 1968–1972, 1980–2020)
 As host team: 1992*
* Number of goalscorers (50+ goals): 1
 Number of goalscorers (40–49 goals): 2
 Number of goalscorers (30–39 goals): 4
 Last updated: 1 April 2021.

Legend and abbreviation
  – Hosts
 BRA – Brazil
 CUB – Cuba
 ESP – Spain

Sources:
 Official Reports (PDF): 1920–1928, 1948–1952, 1968–1972, 1980–1996;
 Official Results Books (PDF): 2000 (pp. 46, 49, 54, 65, 67, 70, 74–75), 2004 (pp. 227–228), 2008 (pp. 193–194), 2012 (pp. 474–475), 2016 (pp. 112–113).

Sweden
 Men's national team: 
 Team appearances: 8 (1908–1924, 1936–1952, 1980)
 As host team: 1912*
* Number of goalscorers (50+ goals): 0
 Number of goalscorers (40–49 goals): 0
 Number of goalscorers (30–39 goals): 0
 Last updated: 1 April 2021.

Switzerland
 Men's national team: 
 Team appearances: 5 (1920–1928, 1936–1948)
 As host team: —
 Number of goalscorers (50+ goals): 0
 Number of goalscorers (40–49 goals): 0
 Number of goalscorers (30–39 goals): 0
 Last updated: 1 April 2021.

Ukraine
 Men's national team: 
 Team appearances: 1 (1996)
 As host team: —
 Related teams: Soviet Union†, Unified Team†
 Number of goalscorers (50+ goals): 0
 Number of goalscorers (40–49 goals): 0
 Number of goalscorers (30–39 goals): 0
 Last updated: 1 April 2021.

Unified Team
 Men's national team:  Unified Team†
 Team appearances: 1 (1992)
 As host team: —
 Related teams: Soviet Union†, Kazakhstan, Russia, Ukraine
 Number of goalscorers (50+ goals): 0
 Number of goalscorers (40–49 goals): 0
 Number of goalscorers (30–39 goals): 0
 Last updated: 1 April 2021.

Note:
 Dmitry Apanasenko is listed in section Russia.

United States
 Men's national team: 
 Team appearances: 22 (1920–1972, 1984*–2020)
 As host team: 1932*, 1984*, 1996*
* Number of goalscorers (50+ goals): 1
 Number of goalscorers (40–49 goals): 0
 Number of goalscorers (30–39 goals): 3
 Last updated: 1 April 2021.

Legend
  – Hosts

Sources:
 Official Reports (PDF): 1920–1972, 1984–1996;
 Official Results Books (PDF): 2000 (pp. 47, 51, 53, 80, 82, 85, 89–90), 2004 (pp. 231–232), 2008 (pp. 214–215), 2012 (pp. 497–498), 2016 (pp. 133–134).

United Team of Germany
 Men's national team:  United Team of Germany†
 Team appearances: 3 (1956–1964)
 As host team: —
 Related teams: Germany, East Germany†, West Germany†
 Number of goalscorers (50+ goals): 0
 Number of goalscorers (40–49 goals): 0
 Number of goalscorers (30–39 goals): 0
 Last updated: 1 April 2021.

Uruguay
 Men's national team: 
 Team appearances: 2 (1936–1948)
 As host team: —
 Number of goalscorers (50+ goals): 0
 Number of goalscorers (40–49 goals): 0
 Number of goalscorers (30–39 goals): 0
 Last updated: 1 April 2021.

West Germany
 Men's national team: †
 Team appearances: 5 (1968–1976, 1984–1988)
 As host team: 1972*
 Related teams: Germany, United Team of Germany†
 Number of goalscorers (50+ goals): 0
 Number of goalscorers (40–49 goals): 0
 Number of goalscorers (30–39 goals): 1
 Last updated: 1 April 2021.

Abbreviation
 FRG – West Germany
 MEX – Mexico

Source:
 Official Reports (PDF): 1968–1976, 1984–1988.
Notes:
 Frank Otto is listed in section Germany.
 Hagen Stamm is listed in section Germany.

Yugoslavia
 Men's national team: †
 Team appearances: 12 (1936–1988)
 As host team: —
 Related teams: Croatia, FR Yugoslavia†, Serbia and Montenegro†, Montenegro, Serbia
* Number of goalscorers (50+ goals): 0
 Number of goalscorers (40–49 goals): 0
 Number of goalscorers (30–39 goals): 3
 Last updated: 1 April 2021.

Source:
 Official Reports (PDF): 1936–1988.
Note:
 Dubravko Šimenc is listed in section Croatia.

FR Yugoslavia
 Men's national team: †
 Team appearances: 2 (1996–2000)
 As host team: —
 Related teams: Yugoslavia†, Serbia and Montenegro†, Montenegro, Serbia
 Number of goalscorers (50+ goals): 0
 Number of goalscorers (40–49 goals): 0
 Number of goalscorers (30–39 goals): 0
 Last updated: 1 April 2021.

Notes:
 Aleksandar Šapić is listed in section Serbia.
 Vladimir Vujasinović is listed in section Serbia.

See also
 Water polo at the Summer Olympics

 Lists of Olympic water polo records and statistics
 List of men's Olympic water polo tournament records and statistics
 List of women's Olympic water polo tournament records and statistics
 List of Olympic champions in men's water polo
 List of Olympic champions in women's water polo
 National team appearances in the men's Olympic water polo tournament
 National team appearances in the women's Olympic water polo tournament
 List of players who have appeared in multiple men's Olympic water polo tournaments
 List of players who have appeared in multiple women's Olympic water polo tournaments
 List of Olympic medalists in water polo (men)
 List of Olympic medalists in water polo (women)
 List of women's Olympic water polo tournament top goalscorers
 List of men's Olympic water polo tournament goalkeepers
 List of women's Olympic water polo tournament goalkeepers
 List of Olympic venues in water polo

Notes

References

Sources

ISHOF

External links
 Olympic water polo – Official website

Top goalscorers, Men